Adis Jahović (born 18 March 1987) is a Macedonian footballer who plays as a forward for Turkish club Bodrumspor.

Club career
Jahović began playing football at the age of 7 with FK Makedonija Gjorče Petrov., and left to Bosnia at the age of 18. Jahović was banned for ten games for making an extremely threatening remark towards the referee of the match against Biel-Bienne.

On 29 August 2014 he made a transfer to FC Krylia Sovetov Samara. With Krylia, he won the 2014–15 Russian National Football League and got promotion to the 2015–16 Russian Premier League.

On 31 August 2016, he joined Turkish Süper Lig club Göztepe S.K. He made an impressive record scoring 35 league goals in 49 league games.

On 30 January 2018 he left Göztepe and joined Konyaspor on a 1,5 million Euro transfer. In 2019, Jahović signed with Yeni Malatyaspor.

On 1 February 2021 he joined Göztepe S.K. again. On 10 April 2021, he scored a hat-trick in a 3-2 win against Hatayspor.

International career
Jahović was born in Macedonia and is of Bosniak origin. He plays for the Macedonian national football team. He debuted on 14 November 2012, during the friendly match between Macedonia and Slovenia. has earned a total of 15 caps, scoring 3 goals. In an October 2016 FIFA World Cup qualification match against Israel, he missed a 90th-minute penalty kick in a 2-1 defeat and announced international retirement soon after the match. However, 5 years later he returned to national team lineup.

Career statistics

International goals
Scores and results list Macedonia's goal tally first.

Honours
Rijeka 
Croatian Super Cup: 2014

Krylia Sovetov Samara 
Russian National Football League: 2014–15

References

External links
 Profile at MacedonianFootball 
 
 

1989 births
Footballers from Skopje
Macedonian Muslims
Macedonian people of Bosnia and Herzegovina descent
Living people
Association football forwards
Macedonian footballers
North Macedonia international footballers
FK Napredok players
FK Makedonija Gjorče Petrov players
FK Željezničar Sarajevo players
FK Velež Mostar players
FK Sarajevo players
FC Wil players
FC Zürich players
FC Vorskla Poltava players
HNK Rijeka players
PFC Krylia Sovetov Samara players
Göztepe S.K. footballers
Konyaspor footballers
Yeni Malatyaspor footballers
Antalyaspor footballers
Macedonian First Football League players
Premier League of Bosnia and Herzegovina players
Swiss Challenge League players
Swiss Super League players
Ukrainian Premier League players
Croatian Football League players
Russian First League players
Russian Premier League players
TFF First League players
Süper Lig players
Macedonian expatriate footballers
Expatriate footballers in Bosnia and Herzegovina
Expatriate footballers in Switzerland
Expatriate footballers in Ukraine
Expatriate footballers in Croatia
Expatriate footballers in Russia
Expatriate footballers in Turkey
Macedonian expatriate sportspeople in Bosnia and Herzegovina
Macedonian expatriate sportspeople in Switzerland
Macedonian expatriate sportspeople in Ukraine
Macedonian expatriate sportspeople in Croatia
Macedonian expatriate sportspeople in Russia
Macedonian expatriate sportspeople in Turkey